Frohawk may refer to:

An ethnic variation of the mohawk hairstyle
Frederick William Frohawk (1861–1946), British artist and entomologist
Frohawk Two Feathers (born 1976), American artist